The 1955 Thomas Cup competition is an international team tournament for supremacy in men's badminton (its female counterpart is the Uber Cup). Beginning in 1948–49, it was held every three years until 1982 and has been held every two years thereafter. Twenty-one national teams officially entered the third Thomas Cup series in 1954-1955 but two of these, Belgium and Burma, defaulted their opening ties (team matches). Four qualifying zones were established: Asia, Australasia, Europe and Pan America. Winners from each zone played-off in Singapore in late May and early June for the right to play Malaya which, as defending champion, was exempt until it met a challenger in a conclusive challenge round tie. For a more detailed description of the Thomas Cup format see Wikipedia's general article on the Thomas Cup.

Intra-zone summary
As it had in the 1951-1952 series, India won the Asian zone, its toughest competition coming in its opening contest against an improving Thailand 6–3 . In Europe Denmark, now boasting nineteen-year-old prodigy Finn Kobbero, beat three opponents with the loss of only one individual match. In the Pan American zone the USA lost 4 of 5 singles matches to Canada but won the tie by sweeping the doubles. In the Australasian zone J. E. Robson's singles victories were not enough to keep his New Zealand team from falling to Australia 2–7.

Inter-zone playoffs
Asian
 India

Americas
 United States

Europe
 Denmark

Australasian
 Australia
 Malaya (exempt until challenge round)

In the inter-zone playoffs India avenged its 1952 loss to the USA by winning 4 of 5 singles matches and holding its own in doubles to defeat the Americans 6–3. Though Australia played some competitive matches against European power Denmark, it was unable to win any of them  (0–9). Young Kobbero was the star of the inter-zone final between Denmark and India. He won all four of his matches which included a fine three game duel with India's stylish Nandu Natekar, leading Denmark to a 6–3 victory. Thus Denmark emerged as the challenger to Cup-holder Malaya.

First round

Final round

Challenge round
The competitive swan song of Malaya's venerable Wong Peng Soon was successful though he dropped a game to both Kobbero and Jørn Skaarup. Eddie Choong, with two All-England singles titles already to his name, made his Thomas Cup debut by beating both Kobbero and Skaarup in straight games. Ong Poh Lim was once again stalwart, winning his match at third singles and both of his doubles partnered by veteran Ooi Teik Hock. The Danes could muster only one victory which came in doubles and largely from the efforts of Kobbero's partner Jorgen Hammergaard Hansen whose powerful smash lived up to his name. Winning 8 matches to 1, Malaya thus retained the Cup.

References
 tangkis.tripod.com
 Mike's Badminton Populorum 
Herbert Scheele ed., The International Badminton Federation Handbook for 1967 (Canterbury, Kent, England: J. A. Jennings Ltd., 1967) 69–73.
Pat Davis, The Guinness Book of Badminton (Enfield, Middlesex, England: Guinness Superlatives Ltd., 1983) 121.

Thomas Cup
Thomas & Uber Cup
T
T
Thom
1955 in Malayan sport
Badminton tournaments in Malaysia
Badminton tournaments in Singapore